In August 2021, the Black Sea region in Turkey was affected by catastrophic flooding, as a series of thunderstorms that began on 7 August 2021 and continued until the 14th in northern Turkey caused several floods and landslides. At least 81 people died and about 228 more were injured in the floods, and more than 1800 people were evacuated as many people were rescued from rooftops. Reports have shown that at least 454 buildings had sustained significant damage. Bridges were also damaged or destroyed, and the infrastructure of multiple towns were significantly affected. Experts have stated that urbanization and climate change in Turkey have made the floods' worse, although to what extent each factor was responsible has been disputed. 

As a response to the floods, the government started a disaster relief campaign, which has faced criticism for using donations instead of taxpayer money. Affected provinces were made disaster areas, and financial help was given to those affected. There have been numerous claims of a hydroelectric power plant malfunction during the flood, which the government has denied. Others have claimed that the public was misled by officials before the event, and that the missing count was an undercount; however, neither of these claims have been confirmed.

Causes

Background 
Unlike the western and southern coasts of Turkey, where summers are generally hot and dry, torrential summer rains on the northern coasts are common, especially east of the Bosporus, as there is no summer dry season, and as precipitation generally amounts to at least  a year. Recent data also suggests that days with heavy rainfall are increasing in northern Turkey, and Borzou Daraghi of The Independent has called the floods "one of multiple climate change-induced calamities" Turkey has faced this summer. However, meteorologist Mikdat Kadıoğlu claimed that climate change "was being used as a scapegoat" in flood events such as this one, and argued that while climate change was partially responsible, other factors were also at play, principally urbanization. Geologists have also pointed to the flood plain of the streams around the flooded area, which have narrowed due to construction, while others claimed that poorly made bridges worsened the destruction.

Meteorological history 

On 6 August 2021, a long-lasting complex of thunderstorms formed in eastern Marmara, with an associated cyclone in Eastern Europe, causing isolated heavy downpours in Istanbul, Gebze and Izmit overnight. The next day, the system moved eastward toward the western Black Sea region, where it would stall for around a week with CAPE values occasionally exceeding 6000 J/kg, creating very favorable conditions for severe downpours. 

While heavy rainfall remained occasional from the 7th to the 9th, the heaviest rainfall occurred from the 10th to the 12th of August, and multiple flash flood warnings were issued by the General Directorate of Meteorology. This likely caused severe flooding in Kastamonu to start about a day into the second rainy period, as a nearby river burst its banks.

Impact 
The event has been described by Interior Minister Süleyman Soylu as "the worst flood disaster" he has ever seen. Bartın, Kastamonu and Sinop provinces were the most affected, where floods destroyed at least 6 bridges, tore up trees and cut off electricity to "hundreds of villages", as "fast-moving waters coursing through city streets" were "swarming buildings and washing away vehicles".

Bozkurt, a town and district in Kastamonu, was among the most severely affected areas, as floodwaters descending from the Küre Mountains led to a fast-moving current along the town's center. This was worsened by the flood's effects on the logging area south of town, as logs drifted through the town center, leading to further damage. There have also been claims of misleading announcements before the flood that delayed citizen response and cost lives, although this has not been confirmed. 

Bozkurt mayor Muammer Yanık lamented the state of the town, which was destroyed, according to him, "in a way that cannot be described", while Sinop mayor Barış Ayhan said that "the infrastructure in Ayancık has completely collapsed, there is no electricity or water". The village of Babaçay, in Sinop, was "almost completely wiped out", as most buildings, including those made to accommodate disaster victims, were toppled, damaged, or destroyed. AFAD announced that electricity could not be supplied to 4 villages in Bartın, 180 villages in Kastamonu and 87 villages in Sinop in Ayancık and Türkeli districts, as water had inundated power plants in the region. At least 81 people have died, 228 were injured while many more are missing, and at least 454 buildings were significantly damaged.

Response

Domestic 
A total of 2472 people were evacuated, and the gendarmerie was dispatched, along with more than 9000 emergency workers; officials and volunteers from AFAD. Helicopters were used to supply electricity to the affected areas, and to rescue people from flooded buildings. Visiting the region on 13 August, President Recep Tayyip Erdoğan declared Kastamonu, Sinop and Bartın disaster areas. Gubernatorial positions were changed to manage the disaster more effectively, as Bozkurt governor Okan Yenidünya was removed from his post to be replaced by Murat Atıcı. The government has cited Atıcı's experience with natural disasters as the reason for this change. Legal action was also taken, as a building contractor was taken into custody, and has been found guilty. The government has offered financial help to affected communities, and organizations including AFAD have sent at least 10 million liras to affected zones. However, a controversial donation campaign was started by the government to aid relief, which many opposition politicians criticized, claiming that taxpayer money should have been enough. 

Authorities had previously warned the area for potential flash flooding, however, many in the area felt that the warnings were inadequate for the severity of the event. Many CHP lawmakers and certain experts said that the floods' effects have been worsened by construction on river banks, which the ruling party has allowed with "lax regulations". President of the Grand Assembly of Turkey Mustafa Şentop emphasized the need for long-term planning, arguing that urbanization on riverbeds "might not cause problems for decades, but perhaps once a century we see such a grim situation", adding that Turkey "needs to plan for centuries later." Many residents in Kastamonu voiced concerns about the missing count, claiming that many more people were missing than official reports have shown, and opposition politician Hasan Baltacı claimed that a total of 329 people were missing, claims which the governor has denied. Interior Minister Soylu argued that the floods should not be politicized, while denying rumors claiming that the floods were caused by a malfunction in the hydroelectric power plant near the affected area.

International 

  – President Ilham Aliyev sent his condolences to the Turkish president, saying that he hopes for a quick recovery of those injured and affected.
  – President Alexander Lukashenko also sent his condolences, stating that the floods in Turkey were received "with great sadness" in Belarus.
  – Minister of Defence Beni Gantz offered to send a rescue team to aid Turkey.
  – President Sadyr Japarov offered his condolences for the people who have lost their lives in the flood.
  – President Volodymyr Zelensky sent his condolences to Turkey, stating that the people of Ukraine share the victims' pain.

The European Union, Ireland, Iran, Pakistan, Bosnia and Herzegovina, Serbia, Belgium ve Kuwait have also sent their condolences.

See also

 2021 Turkey wildfires
 2021 European floods

References

External links

2021 disasters in Turkey
2021 floods in Asia
August 2021 events in Turkey
2021
History of Bartın Province
History of Kastamonu Province
History of Sinop Province
Climate change in Turkey